is a railway station on the Tokyu Ikegami Line in Shinagawa, Tokyo, Japan, operated by the private railway operator Tokyu Corporation.

Lines

Station layout
The station has two ground-level side platforms. There is no connecting bridge or passage between the platforms.

Platforms

History 
The station opened on August 28, 1927. It was rebuilt in 2016.

Passenger statistics
In fiscal 2011, the station was used by an average of 18,443 passengers daily.

Surrounding area

Bus services 
Tokyu Bus from  bus stop.

See also
 List of railway stations in Japan

References

External links  

  

Railway stations in Tokyo
Railway stations in Japan opened in 1927
Tokyu Ikegami Line
Stations of Tokyu Corporation